Rodrigo Andrés Ureña Reyes (born 1 March 1993) is a Chilean footballer who plays for Peruvian club Universitario as a midfielder.

Enternal links
 
 

Living people
1993 births
Footballers from Santiago
Chilean footballers
Chilean expatriate footballers
Chilean Primera División players
Segunda División Profesional de Chile players
Primera B de Chile players
Unión Española footballers
Universidad de Chile footballers
Cobresal footballers
Deportes Temuco footballers
Club Deportivo Palestino footballers
C.D. Antofagasta footballers
Categoría Primera A players
América de Cali footballers
Deportes Tolima footballers
Peruvian Primera División players
Club Universitario de Deportes footballers
Expatriate footballers in Colombia
Chilean expatriate sportspeople in Colombia
Expatriate footballers in Peru
Chilean expatriate sportspeople in Peru
People from Santiago Province, Chile
Association football midfielders